Mark Elder (born December 10, 1977) is an American football coach. He was the head football coach at Eastern Kentucky University from 2016 until 2019. Prior to his tenure at Eastern Kentucky, Elder was an assistant coach at the University of Tennessee.

Biography
Elder graduated from Sycamore High School in 1996, and played football at Case Western Reserve. He began his coaching career with stops at Akron, Lehigh, Iona, Wayne State (MI), and Michigan before he was hired as an assistant football coach at Central Michigan by head coach Butch Jones. When Jones was named head coach at Cincinnati in 2010, Elder was named as an assistant. Elder subsequently followed Jones to Tennessee as an assistant coach in 2013.

On December 8, 2015, it was reported that Elder was to be named head football coach at Eastern Kentucky University. He was formally introduced at a press conference on December 10, 2015. When he began his duties as head coach, he also continued to serve as an assistant coach at Tennessee through the completion of the Outback Bowl.

In four years at EKU, Elder recorded four straight top-25 rated recruiting classes. In 2018, he led the program to a 7–4 record, recording their most wins since the 2014 season.

Prior to the 2019 season, the Elder-led Colonels were named to preseason Top 25 lists by Lindy's Sports and Hero Sports. Additionally, Elder was named as a leading preseason candidate for the Eddie Robinson Award, given to the national coach of the year at the FCS level.

Elder's contract at EKU was not renewed after finishing 7-4 and 7-5 in his final two seasons and failing to make the NCAA Division I Football Championship Subdivision playoffs.

On December 19, 2019, Elder returned to his hometown of Cincinnati to become the new head coach at Moeller HS.

On February 3, 2023, Elder announced that he resigned from Moeller HS.

Personal life
Elder and his wife, Lindsey, have two sons, Owen and Ellis, and one daughter, Lila.

Head coaching record

College

References

External links
 Eastern Kentucky profile

1977 births
Living people
American football safeties
Akron Zips football coaches
Case Western Spartans football players
Central Michigan Chippewas football coaches
Cincinnati Bearcats football coaches
Eastern Kentucky Colonels football coaches
Iona Gaels football coaches
Lehigh Mountain Hawks football coaches
Michigan Wolverines football coaches
Tennessee Volunteers football coaches
Wayne State Warriors football coaches
High school football coaches in Ohio
Players of American football from Cincinnati
Coaches of American football from Ohio